Acinetobacter defluvii is a gram-negative and non-motile bacterium from the genus Acinetobacter which has been isolated from hospital sewage from the West China Hospital in China.

References

External links
Type strain of Acinetobacter defluvii at BacDive -  the Bacterial Diversity Metadatabase

Moraxellaceae
Bacteria described in 2017